Hans Beatrijs Herman Verreyt (born 3 July, 1980) is a Belgian politician and an MP in the Chamber of Representatives for Vlaams Belang.

Verreyt worked as a web designer before entering politics. He was active in the NJSV and the NSV as a teenager and chaired the Antwerp section of the NSV. In 2004, he was elected national chairman of the Vlaams Blok Jongeren (VBJ), the youth wing of the former Vlaams Blok party and subsequently became head of the Vlaams Belang Jongeren when Vlaams Blok was relaunched as Vlaams Belang. He held the post until 2009 after which Barbara Pas succeeded him. During the 2019 Belgian federal election, Verreyt was elected to the Chamber of Representatives for the Antwerp constituency. He has also been a municipal councilor in Boom since 2006.

References 

Living people
21st-century Belgian politicians
1980 births
Vlaams Belang politicians
Members of the Belgian Federal Parliament
Politicians from Antwerp